Nigel Williams may refer to:

Sports
Nigel Williams (footballer) (born 1954), English former professional footballer
Nigel Williams (American football), NFL Player
Nigel Williams (karate), represented Bermuda at the 1995 Pan American Games
Nigel Williams (rugby union), Welsh rugby union referee in 2004–05 Heineken Cup

Others
Nigel Williams (author) (born 1948), British novelist, screenwriter and playwright
Nigel Williams (broadcaster), British broadcaster and voice over artist
Nigel Williams (conservator) (1944–1992), British conservator and restorer
Nigel Williams (children's rights activist), Northern Ireland Commissioner for Children and Young People (2003–2006)
Nigel Christopher Ransome Williams, Ambassador from the United Kingdom to Denmark
Nigel Shawn Williams, Canadian actor and theatre director
Nigel Williams (priest) (born 1963), Welsh, Church of England clergyman

See also
Nigel Williams-Goss